Braunau may refer to:

Places
 Braunau am Inn District, Austria
 Braunau am Inn, a municipality
 Braunau (river), in Bavaria, Germany
 Braunau, Switzerland
 Broumov, Czech Republic, also known as "Braunau" in German
 New Braunau, a village in Puerto Varas, Chile

Other uses
 Braunau in Rohr Abbey, a Benedictine monastery in Rohr in Niederbayern, Bavaria, Germany
 Braunau (meteorite), a meteorite fall in Východočeský kraj, Czech Republic in 1847
 FC Braunau, a football club based in Brannau am Inn